Millionaires and Teddy Bears is a studio LP by the rock artist Kevin Coyne, released in 1979 by Virgin Records.

The poster to promote the album's release was designed by Cooke Key Associates.

Track listing
All tracks composed by Kevin Coyne; except where indicated
 "People" (Coyne, Bob Ward)
 "Having a Party"
 "I'll Go Too"
 "I'm Just a Man"
 "Pretty Park"
 "Let Me Be with You"
 "Marigold"
 "Don't Blame Mandy"
 "Little Miss Portobello"
 "Wendy's Dream"
 "The World is Full of Fools" (Coyne, Bob Ward)

Personnel

Musicians
 Kevin Coyne – acoustic guitar, vocals
 Bob Ward – acoustic and electric guitars
 Paul Wickens – organ, piano, drums, accordion
 Vic Sweeney – drums
 Al James – bass

Other personnel
 Producers: Kevin Coyne and Bob Ward
 Engineers: Vic Sweeney and Al James 
 Cover artwork: Kevin Coyne

References

1979 albums
Kevin Coyne albums
Virgin Records albums